F4 Thailand: Boys Over Flowers is a Thai television series starring Tontawan Tantivejakul, Vachirawit Chivaaree, Jirawat Sutivanichsak, Metawin Opas-iamkajorn and Hirunkit Changkham. Based on the Japanese shōjo manga series Boys Over Flowers  by Yoko Kamio, it serves as the Thai counterpart of the franchise from Taiwan, Japan, South Korea, and China.

Directed by Patha Thongpan and produced by GMMTV together with Parbdee Taweesuk, the series was first announced during GMMTV's "New & Next" event on 15 October 2019. The final official trailer was released on 3rd December 2021. The series aired at GMM 25 on 18th December 2021. It streamed internationally through GMMTV's official YouTube channel and on Viu.

Synopsis
Gorya (Tu) is a typical high school girl who works part-time at a flower shop with her best friend Kaning (Prim) to alleviate her family's poverty. Her life is simple and regular, until she passes the entrance exam of a prestigious, crazy expensive high school, turning her into the family's only hope out of poverty.

The school is famous for its notorious seniors  F4: Thyme (Bright) the group's leader, Ren (Dew), Kavin (Win), and MJ (Nani), four handsome boys who are heirs to the country's richest billionaires. They sparkle with looks, influences and are big bullies. They displays aggressive actions, giving "Red Card" to anybody they don't like. Nobody dares to stop or face them. Gorya despises their artificial lifestyle.

Gorya stands up to Thyme's bullying, leaving all the boys in awe. Thyme is instantly smitten by Gorya and romantically pursues her, however she shows no interest because of his first impression. She has a crush on his best friend Ren, but Ren is in love with his childhood love, Mira (Fah). Amidst all chaos, Gorya slowly begins to fall for Thyme because of his character development and kindness. She becomes aware that Thyme's world is different.

This is coming of age story of a teenage girl along with four popular young boys. They together go through obstacles, mistakes, friendship, encouragement, happiness and sadness. Most importantly, they learn about love and sense the real world of adulthood.

Cast

Supporting
 Chanikan Tangkabodee (Prim) as Kaning Kanittha Na Bangpleang / Manga character: Yuki Matsuoka (Gorya's best friend and Kavin's love interest)
 Cindy Bishop as Roselyn Paramaanantra / Manga character: Kaede Domyouji (Thyme's mother)
 Maria Poonlertlarp as Tia Aiyawarin Paramaanantra / Manga character: Tsubaki Domyouji (Thyme's older sister)
 Yongwaree Anilbol (Fah) as Mira Renita Asavarattanakul / Manga character: Shizuka Todou (Ren's love interest)
 Niti Chaichitathorn (Pompam) as Gawao / Manga character: Proprietress (Gorya and Kaning's boss)
 Wachara Pan-iem (Jeab) as Sanchai Jundee / Manga character: Haruo Makino (Gorya's father)
 Mayurin Pongpudpunth (Kik) as Busaba Jundee / Manga character: Chieko Makino (Gorya's mother)
 Nattawat Jirochtikul (Fourth) as Glakao Jundee / Manga character: Susumu Makino (Gorya's brother)
 Wanwimol Jaenasavamethee (June) as Hana Vidalha Malakarn / Manga character: Sakurako Sanjo (Gorya's friend in school who later betrays her)
 Pansa Vosbein (Milk) as Lita Lalita Empicca / Manga character: Shigeru Okawahara (Thyme's fiancée)
 Pisamai Wilaisak (Mee) as Yupin / Manga character: Tama (Thyme's family's head housekeeper)
 Phatchara Thabthong (Kapook) as Jane / Manga character: Yuriko Asai

Guests
 Kanaphan Puitrakul (First) as Phupha Komolpetch / Manga character: Takayuki Kimoto (Ep. 1, 6, 11)
 Luke Ishikawa Plowden as Dominique Shun / Manga character: Jean P. Mayol (Ep. 6)
 Chanagun Arpornsutinan (Gunsmile) as Tesla / Manga character: Nakatsuka (Kaning's boyfriend) (Ep. 6-7)
 Kay Lertsittichai as Talay Mahasamut Komolpetch / Manga character: Junpei Oribe (Ep. 8-11)
 Ployshompoo Supasap (Jan) as Aum Natnada Saentaweesuk (The Secret Story of Iris) (Ep. 9-16)
 Neen Suwanamas as Mona / Manga character: Sara Hinata (Kavin's first love) (Ep. 12-13)

Production 
After it was announced on 15 October 2019, several names were suggested online by Thai netizens on who should play the main roles.

On 16 September 2020, almost a year since it was announced, GMMTV officially revealed the artists who would be taking the main roles of the said series. Current GMMTV artists Vachirawit Chivaaree and Metawin Opas-iamkajorn, who recently starred in the boys' love series 2gether: The Series and Still 2gether, will be playing two of the F4 members, joined by new faces namely Tontawan Tantivejakul, Hirunkit Changkham and Jirawat Sutivanisak in the said series which is expected to air in 2021. After the announcement of Vachirawit and Metawin as members of F4 Thailand, some online fans expressed their surprise with their new fictional roles but some see it as an "opportunity to grow as an actor."

On the reason why GMMTV decided to acquire the rights of creating the Thai television adaptation of Boys Over Flowers, Sataporn Panichraksapong, who serves as GMMTV's managing director, said that the series has received positive reviews and contains social issues that are currently relevant to the Thai society. He also said that Parbdee Taweesuk will be tasked to produce the series as they have worked with them on several projects already. Parbdee Taweesuk's projects include the trending 2018 television series, The Gifted.

Soundtracks

Reception

Thailand television ratings 
In the table below,  represents the lowest ratings and  represents the highest ratings.

 Based on the average audience share per episode.

International broadcast 
 In the Philippines, F4 Thailand: Boys Over Flowers is simultaneously available for streaming online via iWantTFC every Saturdays at 9:30 pm (PST) starting 18 December 2021 simulcast with Thailand and Sundays at 8:30 pm on Kapamilya Channel, Kapamilya Online Live and A2Z on 19 December 2021 dubbed in Filipino. It re-aired on 2023, on Kapamilya Channel's Primetime Bida Weeknight block, A2Z and TV5's Todo Max Primetime Singko Evening block.

Awards and nominations

References

External links 
 F4 Thailand Official Trailer
 

Boys Over Flowers
Television series by GMMTV
Thai drama television series
Thai romantic comedy television series
2021 Thai television series debuts
GMM 25 original programming
Television series by Parbdee Taweesuk